Minster on Sea is a disused railway station that served Minster on the Isle of Sheppey. It opened in 1901 and closed in 1950.

References

External links
 Minster on Sea station on navigable 1940 O. S. map

Disused railway stations in Kent
Former Sheppey Light Railway stations
Railway stations in Great Britain opened in 1901
Railway stations in Great Britain closed in 1950